Jan Kovařík (born 19 June 1988) is a Czech football player who currently plays for Bohemians 1905. He played for the Czech under-21 team, representing the team at the 2011 UEFA European Under-21 Football Championship.

International career
Kovařík was called up to the senior Czech Republic side in May 2015 for a friendly against Iceland.

Career statistics
As of 30 December 2014

Honours

Club
 FC Viktoria Plzeň
 Czech First League: 2012–13

References

External links

Guardian Football

1988 births
Sportspeople from Most (city)
Living people
Czech footballers
Czech Republic youth international footballers
Czech Republic under-21 international footballers
Czech First League players
SK Slavia Prague players
SK Dynamo České Budějovice players
FK Jablonec players
FC Viktoria Plzeň players
Association football wingers
Bohemians 1905 players